Mihai Bîră (5 September 1929 – March 2021) was a Romanian alpine skier. He competed at the 1948 Winter Olympics and the 1952 Winter Olympics. His son, Mihai Bîră Jr., competed at the 1984 Winter Olympics.

References

1929 births
2021 deaths
Romanian male alpine skiers
Olympic alpine skiers of Romania
Alpine skiers at the 1948 Winter Olympics
Alpine skiers at the 1952 Winter Olympics
Sportspeople from Brașov